The Cryptology ePrint Archive is an electronic archive (eprint) of new results in the field of cryptography, maintained by the International Association for Cryptologic Research. It contains articles covering many of the most recent advances in cryptography, that did not necessarily undergo any refereeing process (yet).

See also
 arXiv
 Electronic Colloquium on Computational Complexity

External links
 ePrint Archive

Cryptography journals
Publications with year of establishment missing
Eprint archives
Open-access archives